The Revelstoke Dam, also known as Revelstoke Canyon Dam, is a hydroelectric dam (combined earthfill dam and gravity dam) spanning the Columbia River,  north of Revelstoke, British Columbia, Canada. The powerhouse was completed in 1984 and has an installed capacity of 2480 MW. Four generating units were installed initially, with one additional unit (#5) having come online in 2011. The reservoir behind the dam is named Lake Revelstoke. The dam is operated by BC Hydro.

History 
Construction of Revelstoke Dam started in 1978, and was completed in 1983.

Areas inundated by the dam include the Dalles des Morts or "Death Rapids", which was the stretch of canyon just above the dam's location, and various small localities along the pre-inundation route of the Big Bend Highway, which was the original route of the Trans-Canada Highway until the building of its Rogers Pass section.  Just below the dam was the location of La Porte, one of the boomtowns of the Big Bend Gold Rush and the head of river navigation via the Arrow Lakes and Columbia River from Marcus, Washington.

Revelstoke Dam Visitor Centre 
The centre features interactive exhibits, activities about the dam and hydroelectricity and a First Nations gallery opened in 2009, with exhibits about the art, history and culture of the Secwepemc (Shuswap), Okanagan and Ktunaxa peoples. Sinixt are not included in the exhibit, but also consider the Revelstoke Dam to fall within their territory. There is also a theatre, gift shop, and outdoor walkway across the top of the Powerhouse.

Expansion 

BC Hydro completed an expansion to add a fifth unit. The unit went online in 2011 and added 500 MW capacity, bringing the total generating capacity of the dam to around 2480 MW. In 2009, the plant generated 6,361 GWh of electricity. By 2018, after the expansion, then plant generated 7,817 GWh of electricity. The dam was built to accommodate a sixth unit, also sized around 500 MW; a contingency plan to build the sixth unit is possible but not scheduled as of December 2018.

See also 

 List of largest power stations in Canada
 List of generating stations in British Columbia
 List of dams in the Columbia River watershed
 Hydroelectric dams on the Columbia River
 Mica Dam
 Keenleyside Dam

References

External links

 BC Hydro Revelstoke Dam Visitor Centre page
 BC Hydro regional power generation info
 BC Hydro information on fifth generating unit

Dams on the Columbia River
Dams in British Columbia
Hydroelectric power stations in British Columbia
Museums in British Columbia
Revelstoke, British Columbia
Dams completed in 1984
Gravity dams
1984 establishments in British Columbia
BC Hydro
Publicly owned dams in Canada